Aaron Coleman (born September 20, 2000) is an American politician. A Democrat, he was the Kansas House Representative for  the 37th district. The district covers the Turner neighborhood and parts of the Argentine and Armourdale neighborhoods of Kansas City in Wyandotte County, Kansas. He was first elected in 2020 at the age of 20.

Coleman has been accused of engaging in abusive and harassing behavior on a series of occasions. He has admitted to and apologized for childhood acts of online bullying, blackmail, and revenge porn. He was arrested twice in late 2021. Following Coleman's 2021 arrests, many members of his own party—including Governor Laura Kelly—called for his resignation. Conversely, Republican House members refused to take more severe action, blocking efforts to expel Coleman. Republican John Barker  said it would set a precedent by removing Coleman for what he'd done prior to his election.

Coleman was suspended from the state Democratic party in February 2022 for two years due to his continuing misconduct. He cannot serve in any party capacity, and the party will not support his campaign. The suspension did not affect his ability to continue serving in public office. After being arrested twice during his first term in office, and continued allegations of domestic violence, Coleman was defeated in a landslide by Melissa Oropeza in the Democratic primary.

Early life
Coleman lives in Kansas City, Kansas with his family. He has worked as a dishwasher. As of 2020, Coleman attended Johnson County Community College. He is Jewish.

Political career
In 2017, as a seventeen-year-old who had dropped out of high school, Coleman entered the race for governor of Kansas as a write-in independent candidate ahead of the 2018 election. Democrat Laura Kelly won the election.

In 2019, Coleman ran for the board of public utilities in Kansas City, Kansas.

Kansas House of Representatives
In 2020, Coleman defeated seven-term incumbent Stan Frownfelter in a Democratic primary in Kansas House of Representatives District 37. The victory was considered an upset. Coleman, then 19 years of age, won by just 14 votes. 

After Coleman admitted to online bullying, blackmail and revenge porn, Frownfelter announced he would run a write-in campaign against Coleman. Coleman initially dropped out of the race, but later reversed his decision. Democratic House Minority Leader Tom Sawyer, supported Frownfelter's write-in campaign, as did Democratic Governor Laura Kelly. Another candidate, Kristina Smith, a paralegal and treasurer of the Wyandotte County Republican Party, also pursued a write-in campaign. The Kansas Young Democrats endorsed Frownfelter and condemned Coleman. 

In August 2020, Coleman told former Republican state lawmaker John Whitmer that he would "laugh and giggle when you get COVID and die". Coleman claimed Whitmer was repeating anti-mask “conspiracy theories”.

Coleman ran on a platform of women's rights (specifically, access to contraceptives and abortion services, as well as equal pay), tuition-free public college, defunding the police, Medicare for all, legalizing cannabis, and the Green New Deal.

Coleman won the general election to the Kansas House of Representatives on November 3, 2020 at the age of 20.

In November 2020, Coleman tweeted that he would "call out a hit" on Kansas Governor Laura Kelly, and predicted she would face an "extremely bloody" Democratic primary in 2022. Coleman said that his tweet was not a call for physical violence against the governor, but an expression of his belief that Kelly's moderate political positions did not appeal to him or the party's left wing; he self-identifies as a democratic socialist. In response, Sawyer and state Democratic chair Vicki Hiatt stated that Democrats in the House would file a complaint against Coleman when he was sworn in and work for the two-thirds vote required to remove him from office. Seven recently-elected female Democratic state legislators signed a December 21, 2020, letter calling on Coleman to resign before taking office.

On December 31, 2020, Sawyer denied Coleman any committee seat assignments in the incoming legislature.

On January 13, 2021, two days after being sworn in to the Kansas House of Representatives, Coleman announced he had left the Democratic Party and would sit as an independent. On February 8, he re-joined the Democrats.

Coleman had also threatened Sawyer. The chair of the committee investigating Coleman, Republican John Barker,  said, "I don't want to set a precedent." Republican Kristey Williams, commented on the opposition to Coleman's removal, "I think this is a good compromise," (the avoidance of a House vote on expulsion). Skeptical Democratic committee members, unpersuaded by Coleman's testimony, wanted stronger action. Shawnee Democratic Representative Cindy Neighbor, shared her concerns that there was a repeated pattern of behavior that could continue to pose security threats for members. "Something has to be done because otherwise this is a slap in the face of those who are his victims — and they are victims....So whatever we do has to have strong accountability measures."  Following the hearing, Sawyer characterized Republican's action as "essentially...a reprimand," and expressed disappointment at the lack of stronger discipline. Sawyer also said his former chief of staff, Heather Scanlon, had been threatened by Coleman. In February 2021, the Select Investigating Committee of the Kansas House of Representatives sent Coleman a letter of warning and admonition in regard to past conduct unbecoming of a state legislator. Following Coleman's October 2021 arrest on domestic violence charges, Sawyer called Coleman's more recent arrest "extremely disturbing news" and said Coleman should "resign and get the help he badly needs." After Coleman was arrested again in November 2021, for allegedly driving under the influence of alcohol, Sawyer again requested Coleman's resignation, as did Kelly. She called for the legislature to expel Coleman if he did not voluntarily leave office. A complaint was filed seeking Coleman's removal from office.

Coleman ran for re-election to the Kansas House of Representatives in 2022. He faced two primary challengers and finished in a distant third with just 13.1% of the vote. Melissa Oropeza, a nurse practitioner, won the Democratic primary with 49.2% of the vote.

Legal troubles and allegations of wrongdoing
After his 2020 Kansas House primary victory, Coleman's past history generated significant controversy, leading to him admitting that he had leaked revenge porn in middle school when he was 12. He has also admitted to bullying, extortion, and threats of physical violence at his middle school. 

The Kansas City Star reported that in May 2015, when Coleman was 14, he was arrested and charged for threatening to shoot a girl at another high school. He was initially charged with a felony count of making a criminal threat, but later pleaded guilty to a misdemeanor charge of harassment.

Coleman has apologized for his bullying, extortion, and revenge porn activities. Coleman asserted he had experienced child abuse from his elementary school teachers. On June 17, 2020, Coleman said, on Facebook, that he spent “the vast majority” of his elementary school education “in a closet” instead of getting proper help at school. Coleman claims that he was diagnosed with post-traumatic stress disorder at 15. Turner USD #202 school district, where Coleman went to elementary school, stated that they do not “put kids in closets”.

Domestic violence 
Coleman's ex-girlfriend, Taylor Passow, has alleged that on December 27, 2019, Coleman choked and slapped her in a hot tub. Passow said that in another incident on December 31, Coleman slapped and choked her again and told her to kill herself. The Topeka Capitol-Journal reported that Coleman also sent Passow a text message that said, "I hope you get abducted raped chopped up and have ya pieces scattered and Burnt in different locations." Furthermore, Coleman allegedly told Passow that if she became pregnant, "'I will have to kill you and the baby'". Coleman later acknowledged having been abusive to Passow, but denied choking her.

Other legal troubles 
On December 4, 2020, Kathleen Lynch, a Wyandotte County, Kansas judge, issued a temporary anti-stalking order (no-contact order) against Coleman after Brandie Armstrong, the campaign manager for Frownfelter, accused Coleman of harassment. The two later reached an agreement.

In October 2021, Coleman was banned from all offices of the Kansas Department of Labor after allegedly accosting a police officer in "a loud and demanding tone" when demanding to enter a restricted section of the agency's Topeka headquarters. Coleman disputed this account.

On October 30, 2021, Coleman was arrested by Overland Park police on a domestic violence charge. Coleman was alleged to have hit and spat upon his brother and to have threatened to attack his grandfather. Coleman was released on bail, with the judge ordering him to undergo a mental health evaluation and follow recommendations by the provider. He pleaded not guilty.

On November 28, 2021, Coleman was arrested in Douglas County, Kansas on suspicion of driving while under the influence of alcohol (DUI). He had been cited for doing 91 mph on an Interstate, wandering out of his lane, and his failures to follow the instructions of the police officer who made the traffic stop. In January 2022 the DUI charge was dropped, and he was instead charged with traffic infractions, which included exceeding maximum speed limits and failing to yield to emergency vehicles.

Electoral history

References

External links
 Ballotpedia — Aaron Coleman

2000 births
21st-century American Jews
21st-century American politicians
Jewish American people in Kansas politics
Kansas Independents
Living people
Democratic Party members of the Kansas House of Representatives
Politicians from Kansas City, Kansas